The Iglesia de Nuestra Señora del Carmen is a church in Hatillo, Puerto Rico dating from 1879.  It was listed on the National Register of Historic Places in 1984.

It was designed by Pedro A. Beibal.

It is one of 31 churches reviewed for listing on the National Register in 1984.

See also

References

Roman Catholic churches completed in 1879
19th-century Roman Catholic church buildings
Churches on the National Register of Historic Places in Puerto Rico
Spanish Colonial architecture in Puerto Rico
1870s establishments in Puerto Rico
Hatillo, Puerto Rico
1879 establishments in the Spanish Empire